Polumenta is a surname. Notable people with the surname include:

Dado Polumenta (born 1982), Montenegrin singer
Šako Polumenta (born 1968), Montenegrin singer